Bricmont is a surname. Notable people with the surname include:

 Jean Bricmont (born 1952), Belgian theoretical physicist, philosopher of science, and academic
 Saskia Bricmont (born 1985), Belgian politician
 Wendy Greene Bricmont (born 1949), American film editor